A prolate rotator galaxy, or spindle galaxy, is an unusual class of galaxy that is cigar-shaped and rotates around its long axis. A prolate rotator galaxy is an elliptical galaxy in prolate rotation, meaning they possess a significant amount of rotation around their major axis. To create a prolate rotator galaxy, two large spiral galaxies must collide at right angles. One forms the central bar, the other the disk. The bar then dominates the system.

, 20 such galaxies were known. Their existence is also predicted by large-scale cosmological simulations.

References 

Galaxy morphological types
Lenticular galaxies